Cesare Mulazzi (born 30 May 1965) a former Italian male canoeist who won medals at senior level at the Wildwater Canoeing World Championships.

Biography
After finishing his activity in the sport of canoeing, he became an athlete of senior sport.

References

External links
 Cesare Mulazzi  at Il cittadino

1965 births
Living people
Italian male canoeists
Senior sport competitors